The 2018–19 Texas A&M–Corpus Christi Islanders women's basketball team represented Texas A&M University–Corpus Christi in the 2018–19 NCAA Division I women's basketball season. The Islanders were led by seventh-year head coach Royce Chadwick, and played their home games at the American Bank Center and the Dugan Wellness Center, as members of the Southland Conference. They finished the season 17–16 overall, 8–10 in Southland play to finish in a tie for sixth place. As the No. 6 seed in the Southland women's tournament, they defeated New Orleans in the first round, Nicholls in the quarterfinals, Stephen F. Austin in the semifinals, before losing a close game to No. 4 seed Abilene Christian, 68–69 in the championship game.

Previous season
The Islanders finished the 2017–18 season 19–12, 11–7 in Southland play to finish in a three way tie for fourth place. They advanced to the semifinals of the Southland women's tournament where they lost to Nicholls State.

Media
Video streaming of all non-televised home games and audio for all road games is available at GoIslanders.com.

Roster
Sources:

Schedule and Results
Sources:

|-
!colspan=9 style=| Non-conference regular season

|-
!colspan=9 style=| Southland regular season

|-
!colspan=9 style=| Southland Women's Tournament

See also
2018–19 Texas A&M–Corpus Christi Islanders men's basketball team

References

Texas A&M–Corpus Christi Islanders women's basketball seasons
Texas AandM-Corpus Christi
Texas AandM-Corpus Christi Islanders basketball
Texas AandM-Corpus Christi Islanders basketball